Paley's Place was a restaurant serving Pacific Northwest cuisine in Portland, Oregon's Northwest District, in the United States.

Description and history 
Housed in a Victorian home along Northwest 21st Avenue, the restaurant was established by chef Vitaly and Kimberly Paley in 1995. Thrillist has described Paley's as "an intimate bistro-style eatery". Julian Smith of Frommer's rated the "upscale bistro" 2 out of 3 stars.

In October 2021, owners confirmed plans to close after Thanksgiving.

See also
 James Beard Foundation Award: 2000s
 List of defunct restaurants of the United States
 List of Pacific Northwest restaurants

References

External links

 
 
 Paley's Place at the Food Network

1995 establishments in Oregon
2021 disestablishments in Oregon
Defunct Pacific Northwest restaurants
Defunct restaurants in Portland, Oregon
Northwest District, Portland, Oregon
Restaurants disestablished in 2021
Restaurants established in 1995
Pacific Northwest restaurants in Oregon